Sorubim lima is a species of fish of the Pimelodidae family in the order Siluriformes.

Morphology 
Males can reach 54.2 cm in total length and 1,300 g in weight. Their body is devoid of scales and covered with bone plaques. It has an irregular gray list from the head to the caudal fin. The head is long and flat. The mouth is round and the upper jaw is larger than the jaw. The eyes are located laterally. Its back is dark brown on the front, yellowish and then whitish below the side line. Its fins are reddish to pink.

Food 
It eats mainly fish and crustaceans.

Habitat 
It is a freshwater fish living in tropical climate (23 °C-30 °C).

References 

 Bloch, M. E. & J. G. Schneider. 1801. M. E. Blochii, Systema Ichthyologiae: i-lx + 1-584, Pls. 1-110.
 Zaniboni Filho, E., S. Meurer, O.A. Shibatta i A.P. by Oliverira Nuñer, 2004. Illustrated catalog of fish from the high Uruguay River. Florianópolis: Editora da UFSC : Tractebel Energia. 128 p. : col. ill., col. maps ; 25 cm.
  IGFA, 2001. Database of IGFA fishing records until 2001. IGFA, Fort Lauderdale, Florida, United States.
 Sorubim lima (Bloch & Schneider, 1801); FishBase.
 Peixes de água doce do Brasil - Jurupensém (Sorubim lima); CPT Courses (in Portuguese). Accessed on September 19, 2016.

Bibliography 
 Eschmeyer, William N., ed. 1998. Catalog of Fishes. Special Publication of the Center for Biodiversity Research and Information, no. 1, vol. 1-3. California Academy of Sciences. San Francisco, California, United States. 2905. 
 Fenner, Robert M.: The Conscientious Marine Aquarist. Neptune City, New Jersey, United States: T.F.H. Publications, 2001.
 Helfman, G., B. Collette and D. Facey: The diversity of fishes. Blackwell Science, Malden, Massachusetts, United States, 1997.
 Moyle, P. and J. Cech.: Fishes: An Introduction to Ichthyology, 4th edition, Upper Saddle River, New Jersey, United States: Prentice-Hall. Year 2000.
 Nelson, J.: Fishes of the World, 3rd edition. New York, United States: John Wiley and Sons. Year 1994.
 Wheeler, A.: The World Encyclopedia of Fishes, 2nd edition, London: Macdonald. Year 1985.

Pimelodidae